Amund Braaten (6 December 1849 – 2 October 1919) was a Norwegian farmer and politician.

He was born at Slåstadbråten in Sør-Odal as a son of farmers Jest Braaten (1802–1859) and Marthe Melgaarden (1813–1871). He was a farmer at Slåstadbråten until 1887, when he took over as forest manager for the companies And. H. Kiær & Co. and Lier, Varald og Bogen. He remained so until 1919.

From 1889 to 1891 he was a member of the city council and school board of Kongsvinger. He served in Vinger municipal council from 1895 to 1897, then in Kongsvinger city council again from 1910 to 1913. In the 1915 election he stood as the running mate of Axel Thallaug in the constituency Lillehammer, Hamar, Gjøvik og Kongsvinger, and was elected as a deputy representative to the Parliament of Norway for one term, representing the Liberal Left Party. The term finished in 1918, and he died in 1919.

References

1849 births
1919 deaths
Politicians from Kongsvinger
People from Sør-Odal
Norwegian farmers
Deputy members of the Storting
Free-minded Liberal Party politicians
20th-century Norwegian politicians
Hedmark politicians